Jhinjhak (pronounced jheenjhak) is a town and a Municipal council in Kanpur Dehat district, India.

History 
Jhinjhak Nagar Panchayat was founded on January 11, 1916, by the British Government. In 1972, its territory expanded to include the nearby villages "Turana" and "Tikan Gaon." In 2016, Jhinjhak gained the Nagar Palika Parishad, further expanding its territory to include nearby villages.

Transport

Rail
Jhinjhak is served by the Kanpur-Phaphund-Tundla Sub-section, of Kanpur-Delhi section. Jhinjhak Railway Station is on the Delhi-Howrah rail route. It is a major station between Etawah and Kanpur central. It lies on the North Central railway zone. To the east, Ambiapur Station (10 km) is the nearest station. Going west, Parjani (5 km) is the next station. Kanpur Central Railway Station is the nearest major railway station.

Direct trains to Kanpur Central, Lucknow, Allahabad, Patna, Etawah, Dibiyapur, Agra, Delhi, Hathras run from this railway station.

Road
Jhinjhak is 50 km from the town Agra-Lucknow's expressway. A road network connects the city to nearby cities including Dibiyapur, Auraiya, Kannauj, and Kanpur.

Air
Jhinjhak has two airports. Lucknow Airport services major cities within the country as well as several international destinations. Kanpur Chakeri Airport services strictly domestic destinations.

Places of worship
 Akshayvat Akhaivar Temple
 Jai Mata Di Temple
 Shiva and Hanuman temple at Chota Chouraha
 Sati Maa temple, Basti

References

External links
Jhinjhak at India9.com

 http://www.livehindustan.com/uttar-pradesh/kanpur/story-ramnath-kovind-was-born-in-kanpur-dehat-studied-in-kanpur-1145989.html

 Cities and towns in Kanpur Dehat district